Flavius Probus (born c. 420, 430 or 435), a Roman Senator and a v. nob. (vir nobilis) of Narbonne, then Narbo, was a man of literary taste and precocious ability. His father was Flavius Magnus, Consul of Rome in 460. He was a friend of Sidonius Apollinaris from their schooldays.

He married before 450 Eulalia (?), born c. 425, a cousin of Sidonius Apollinaris, daughter of Thaumastus. They were perhaps the parents of:

 Industria of Narbonne, then Narbo, born c. 450 or 465, married before 475 to Tonantius Ferreolus
 Firminus (455 or 460 – c. 503), v. inl. at Arles, then Arelate, and a propinq. of Magnus Felix Ennodius
 Probatius (certain son), Bishop of Uzès in 506

References
 Sidonius Apollinaris, The Letters of Sidonius (Oxford: Clarendon, 1915), pp. clx-clxxxiii

5th-century births
5th-century Romans
Senators of the Roman Empire
Year of death unknown
Date of death unknown